Harold Atkinson may refer to:

Harold M. Atkinson, screenwriter of The Ace of Scotland Yard
Harold Atkinson (footballer) (1925–2003), English footballer
Harold C. Atkinson (1900–1977), Canadian politician in the Legislative Assembly of New Brunswick

See also
Harry Atkinson (disambiguation)